Odyssey Re Holdings Corp., headquartered in Stamford, Connecticut, United States, is an underwriter of property and casualty treaty and facultative reinsurance, as well as specialty insurance.  It is a wholly owned subsidiary of Fairfax Financial, a financial services holding company. OdysseyRe operates through four divisions: Americas, EuroAsia, London Market and US Insurance. OdysseyRe offers a range of property, casualty, surety and credit, marine and energy, aviation and space reinsurance products from offices  around the world.

For the year ended on December 31, 2010, reinsurance represented 65.0% of gross premiums written, and primary insurance represented the remaining 35.0%.

Odyssey Re was listed as one of America's 400 Best Big Companies by Forbes in 2008 for the fourth time. The company's support of a Super-PAC in the 2012 United States presidential election has been deemed controversial by some, as interference by a Canadian-owned entity in American domestic politics.

References

External links

1996 establishments in Connecticut
American companies established in 1996
Financial services companies established in 1996
2009 mergers and acquisitions
Companies formerly listed on the New York Stock Exchange
Insurance companies of the United States
Reinsurance companies
Companies based in Stamford, Connecticut
American subsidiaries of foreign companies
Fairfax Financial